Strochitsy (Strochytsa - ), also named Strochitsy-Ozertso, is a village and municipality in Belarus, located in the Minsk Region. It is part of the Minsk District and the municipality includes the village of Ozertso (Azyartso -  ).

Geography
The municipality is located in western suburb of Minsk, and is part of its urban area. It is crossed by the river Ptsich and is few km away from Fanipol. Strochitsy village lies by the Volkovichskoye Lake, Ozertso is close to the Maskouski District of Minsk and to the Minsk Ringroad MKAD.

State Museum of Folk Architecture and Life
Between Strochitsy and Ozertso there is the Belarusian State Museum of Folk Architecture and Life, an open-air museum containing the original wooden Belarusian farmsteads, churches and household buildings.

References

External links

Villages in Belarus
Populated places in Minsk Region
Minsk District